International Yo-Yo Federation (IYYF) is an international Yo-yo organization that promotes World Yo-Yo Contest and European Yo-Yo Championship and develops and promotes yo-yoing as a sport on a global level.

History
The International Yo-Yo Federation (IYYF) was formed on February 8, 2013. World Yo-Yo Contest had been promoted by Greg Cohen since 2000. IYYF was formed to promote world Yo-Yo contest and other international competitions. The United States, the Czech Republic, Japan, and Brazil are the first national members to join the IYYF.

Executive Board
Ondrej Sedivy (Czech Yoyo Association)
Hironori Mii (Japan Yo-Yo Federation)
Rafael Matsunaga (Brazilian YoYo Association)
Thad Winzenz (US National Yo-Yo League)
Jan Kordovsky (Czech Yoyo Association)

References

External links
International Yo-Yo Federation

Yo-yos